Angelica is a 2015 American horror thriller film directed by Mitchell Lichtenstein and starring Jena Malone, Janet McTeer, Ed Stoppard, and Tovah Feldshuh. It was screened in the Panorama section of the 65th Berlin International Film Festival. It is based on the novel of the same name by Arthur Phillips.

Plot Summary
A couple living in Victorian London endure an unusual series of psychological and supernatural happenings following the birth of their child.

Cast
 Jena Malone as Constance
 Janet McTeer as Anne Montague
 Ed Stoppard as Dr. Joseph Barton
 Tovah Feldshuh as Nora
 Charles Keating as Dr. Miles
 Henry Stram as Dr. Willette
 Daniel Gerroll as Dr. Pinfield-Smith
 James Norton as Harry
 Glynnis O'Connor as Older Constance

References

External links
 

2015 films
2015 horror films
2015 horror thriller films
American horror thriller films
Films based on American novels
Films scored by Zbigniew Preisner
2010s English-language films
2010s American films